You've Got Me By the Wing (Spanish: Me traes de un ala) is a 1953 Mexican comedy film directed by Gilberto Martínez Solares and starring Germán Valdés, Silvia Pinal and Aurora Segura.

Cast 
 Germán Valdés as Tin Tan
 Silvia Pinal as Rosita Alba Vírez
 José María Linares-Rivas as Gámez
 Aurora Segura as María Celis
 Fernando Soto as Narciso
 Marcelo Chávez as Jiménez
 Maruja Grifell as Eulalia
 Wolf Ruvinskis as Mayordomo
 Juan García as Jefe de redacción
 Joaquín García Vargas as Comisario
 Guillermo Hernández as Criado
 Pepe Hernández as Guardia
 Pompín Iglesias as Policía
 Araceli Julián as Cantante
 Elena Julián as Cantante
 Rosalía Julián as Cantante
 Vicente Lara as Vendedor de cigarros
 Consuelo Monteagudo as Adelaida - cantante ridícula
 José Ortega as Ojitos de celuloide
 José Pardavé
 Francisco Reiguera
 Humberto Rodríguez
 Julio Sotelo as Anunciador teatro
 Rafael Torres as Mesero
 Antonio Valdés
 Manuel 'Loco' Valdés as Bailarín
 Ramón Valdés as González
 Guillermo Álvarez Bianchi as Hombre contesta teléfono

References

Bibliography 
 Amador, María Luisa. Cartelera cinematográfica, 1950-1959. UNAM, 1985.

External links 
 

1953 films
1953 comedy films
Mexican comedy films
1950s Spanish-language films
Films directed by Gilberto Martínez Solares
Films scored by Manuel Esperón
Mexican black-and-white films
1950s Mexican films